Thornton v. Schreiber, 124 U.S. 612 (1888), was a United States Supreme Court case in which the Court held a copyright holder may not personally sue an employee of a business for copyright infringement if the employee was holding the infringing material on the order of their employer.

References

External links
 

1888 in United States case law
United States copyright case law
United States Supreme Court cases
United States Supreme Court cases of the Fuller Court